The Bălana is a right tributary of the river Ghighiu in Romania. It flows into the Ghighiu near Fulga de Sus.

References

Rivers of Romania
Rivers of Prahova County